You've Got to Laugh is the seventh studio album by Nik Kershaw, released on 26 October 2006 under his own record label. Initially, the album was only available for purchase online via his web site through his own studio, Shorthouse Records. The album is currently available for digital download via iTunes or eMusic, as well as other music streaming services such as Spotify.

In a 2008 interview, Kershaw spoke of the album. "You've Got to Laugh took about five years to get together. That wasn't intense recording, obviously. I just waited until I'd got enough tracks and that was the time to release it. Had it not been for my girlfriend, it probably wouldn't have been released at all. The songs are all about my own experiences or those of people around me; they're about friends and foes; they're about real life, which means there's nothing too glamorous going on".

No songs from the album were released as singles. At the end of the CD sleeve, there is a dedication note to Kershaw's late father, Douglas John Kershaw (24 February 1920 – 30 July 2005). The holding page on the official Nik Kershaw website had an instrumental in-work version of the closing track "You Don't Have to Be the Sun".

Track listing
All songs written by Nik Kershaw.

Credits
Credits adapted from AllMusic.

Personnel
 Nik Kershaw - vocals, guitars, keyboards, programming
 Stuart Ross - bass (tracks 5-7, 9, 12)
 Nick Beggs - bass, Chapman Stick (tracks 2-4, 11)
 Julian Brown - drums (tracks 2-6, 8-9)
 Simon Phillips - drums (tracks 1, 7, 11)
 Imogen Heap - backing vocals (tracks 5, 8, 12)
 Lily Gonzalez - backing vocals (tracks 1-4, 11)

Production
 Julian Brown's drums recorded by Mark "Tufty" Evans at Wispington Studios
 Tracks 8 & 12 mixed by Mark "Tufty" Evans at Wispington Studios
 Mastered by Simon Heyworth at Super Audio Mastering, Devon
 Published by Zomba Music

Artwork
 Graphic Design by Aurile Ltd.
 Main cover artwork by Frank Renlie
 Photography by Kim Zumwalt

References

External links
 Lyrics for all tracks on this album (scroll down to the bottom to see links to them)

Nik Kershaw albums
2006 albums